Patrick Mabedi (born November 5, 1973 in Blantyre) is a retired Malawian footballer (soccer). His position is defender. He also played for the country's national team for a long time. He is nicknamed Bosti or General.

Career
Under coach Ted Dumitru, Mabedi and Fabian McCarthy formed a solid last line of defence that took the Glamour Boys to its first title in 12 years in breath-taking fashion with six points of second-place Ajax Cape Town with only three defeats the entire season.

Coaching career
Mabedi began his coaching career as the head, youth department, for Moroka Swallows from 2011 till 2015 and was later appointed as their assistant coach during the 2014-15 season under Craig Rosslee. The following season he left Swallows and joined Mpumalanga Black Aces, and spent the season as their assistant coach to Muhsin Ertuğral when they finished fourth in the Absa Premiership, 24 points behind champions Mamelodi Sundowns. In 2016, he had a brief spell as the assistant coach of the Malawian national team before taking up the role of head coach of Cape Town All Stars guiding them to a ninth-place finish in the 2016-17 National First Division season.

In June 2017, Mabedi was appointed assistant manager of Kaizer Chiefs. On 23 April 2018, he was appointed caretaker manager for the rest of the season. In early December, Chiefs relieved him of his duties as the team’s assistant coach after the club had also terminated the contract of the club's head coach. In the summer 2019, he was appointed assistant manager of Black Leopards under Lionel Soccoia. The duo was fired on 17 September 2019.

References

External links
 

Currently working as a head coach for Moroka Swallows academy.

1973 births
Living people
People from Blantyre
Malawian footballers
Malawian football managers
Malawian expatriate footballers
Association football defenders
Kaizer Chiefs F.C. players
Moroka Swallows F.C. players
Nyasa Big Bullets FC players
Kaizer Chiefs F.C. managers
Malawian expatriate sportspeople in South Africa
Expatriate soccer players in South Africa
Malawi international footballers